Luzula forsteri, commonly known as southern wood-rush, is a species of perennial plant in Juncaceae family that is native to Europe, north Africa and western Asia. There is a record of it having been collected at Salem, Oregon in 1910.

The species was named for Edward Forster the Younger (1765–1849).

References

forsteri
Flora of Europe
Flora of North Africa
Flora of Western Asia
Plants described in 1804
Taxa named by Augustin Pyramus de Candolle
Taxa named by James Edward Smith